Gould's hooded snake (Suta gouldii), also known commonly as the black-headed snake, is a species of venomous snake in the family Elapidae. The species is endemic to Western Australia.

Etymology
The specific name, gouldii, is in honor of English ornithologist John Gould.

Description

Habitat
The preferred natural habitats of S. gouldii are forest, shrubland, grassland, and rocky areas.

Reproduction
S. gouldii is viviparous.

Venom
Although S. gouldii is venomous, its bite is considered to be of lesser medical significance. A life-threatening envenomation is unlikely, but a debilitating injury is possible.

References

Further reading
Cogger HG (2014). Reptiles and Amphibians of Australia, Seventh Edition. Clayton, Victoria, Australia: CSIRO Publishing. xxx + 1,033 pp. .
Gray JE (1841). "Description of some new Species and four new Genera of Reptiles from Western Australia, discovered by John Gould, Esq." Annals and Magazine of Natural History, [First Series ] 7: 86–91. (Elaps gouldii, new species, p. 91).
Wilson, Steve; Swan, Gerry (2013). A Complete Guide to Reptiles of Australia, Fourth Edition. Sydney: New Holland Publishers. 522 pp. .

Snakes of Australia
Suta
Reptiles described in 1841
Taxa named by John Edward Gray
Taxobox binomials not recognized by IUCN